Robinson Pass (Prohod Robinson), in Antarctica, is the ice-covered saddle of elevation  between Sostra Heights on the east and the side ridge on the west that trends east-northeast from Mount Dalrymple on the main crest of northern Sentinel Range in Ellsworth Mountains, Antarctica.  It is part of the glacial divide between Sabazios Glacier to the north and Embree Glacier to the south.

The pass is named after the Australian James Kerguelen Robinson (1859–1914), the first human born south of the Antarctic Convergence – on board the sealing ship Offley in Gulf of Morbihan (Royal Sound then), Kerguelen Island on 11 March 1859.

Location

Maps
 Newcomer Glacier.  Scale 1:250 000 topographic map.  Reston, Virginia: US Geological Survey, 1961.
 Antarctic Digital Database (ADD). Scale 1:250000 topographic map of Antarctica. Scientific Committee on Antarctic Research (SCAR). Since 1993, regularly updated.

Notes

References
 Robinson Pass. SCAR Composite Gazetteer of Antarctica.
 Bulgarian Antarctic Gazetteer. Antarctic Place-names Commission. (details in Bulgarian, basic data in English)

External links
 Robinson Pass. Copernix satellite image

Ellsworth Mountains
Bulgaria and the Antarctic
Mountain passes of Ellsworth Land